Joseph Burkhardt-Born (1873–1952) was a Swiss painter.

References
This article was initially translated from the German Wikipedia.

19th-century Swiss painters
Swiss male painters
20th-century Swiss painters
1873 births
1952 deaths
19th-century Swiss male artists
20th-century Swiss male artists